Espen Garnås (born 31 December 1994) is a Norwegian football defender who plays as a central defender for Lillestrøm.

References

1994 births
Living people
People from Nes, Buskerud
Norwegian footballers
Kjelsås Fotball players
Ullensaker/Kisa IL players
Lillestrøm SK players
Norwegian First Division players
Eliteserien players
Association football defenders
Sportspeople from Viken (county)